Meates v Attorney-General [1983] NZLR 308 is a cited case in New Zealand regarding negligence cases against the government.

Background
Matai Industries was a West Coast timber firm. After the promised financial assistance promised to Matai by various Ministers, and the Prime Minister Norman Kirk failed to eventuate, Matai was placed into receivership.

Meates, one of the shareholders in Matai, sued the government in tort. The Government countered that they owed Matai no duty of care.

Held
The court held that the government owed Matai a duty of care.

References

Court of Appeal of New Zealand cases
New Zealand tort case law
1983 in New Zealand law
1983 in case law